Siri Fort Auditorium is premier multi-auditorium complex of Government of India. Situated in the Siri Fort in New Delhi, it is also the headquarters of the Directorate of Film Festivals (DFF), Ministry of Information and Broadcasting, which also run the complex. Also close by is the Siri Fort Sports Complex. It was a combined seating capacity of 2500, spread over its four auditorium, making it the largest such complex in Delhi. Besides the National Film Festival organized by DFF wherein public screening of National Film Award winning films is held, it also hosts musical concerts, cultural performances, and plays.

History

Built in the historic Siri Fort area, the 14th-century settlement of Delhi built by Alauddin Khalji the main auditorium no. I, was built by the Delhi Development Authority (DDA) during 1982 Asian Games held in Delhi. In 1986, the auditorium was taken over by the Ministry of Information and Broadcasting at a cost . Subsequently, the Ministry added three smaller auditoriums, Auditorium-II in 1992, Auditorium-III in 1996 and Auditorium-IV in 2003 The complex underwent a renovation in 2009–2010.

Transport
The nearest station of Delhi Metro is Hauz Khas metro station located on the Yellow Line

References

External links

 Directorate of Film Festivals, Official website

Government buildings in Delhi
Entertainment venues in India
Concert halls in India
Cultural infrastructure completed in 1982
Event venues established in 1982
1982 establishments in Delhi
20th-century architecture in India